Rockefeller Music Hall, ordinarily referred to simply as Rockefeller, is a concert venue located in Torggata, downtown Oslo, Norway. The building, known as "Torggata Bad" ("Market Street Bath"), used to house a public bathing facility. To this day the surrounding floors of the building consists of Tilt Oslo, Torggata Bar, Oslo Streetfood and Oslo Bar & Bowling.

The music hall was established in 1986, and it can host between 1600 and 2000 people depending on the type of gig, show or festival currently running. Rockefeller is owned by the Rockefeller Music Hall Company, of which also runs John Dee (pax 488), which is a smaller venue located in the lower floors of the same building complex. The company also owns a slightly bigger venue, Sentrum Scene (pax 1750), located across the street at Arbeidersamfunnets Plass. Both Rockefeller and Sentrum Scene are known for its high volume of concert events, very often involving pop and rock music, as well as cultural events with Norwegian and international artists such as the annual Inferno Festival, By:Larm and Musikkfest Oslo.

The venue consists of a main hall, a large gallery, a smaller upper gallery, a rooftop with bar, and several lounge bars across the sides of the main music hall.

Several popular podcasts are regularly recorded at Rockefeller, as well as public radio shows hosted by NRK, among others.

The Coldplay EP Trouble - Norwegian Live EP was recorded at the venue.

References

External links
Rockefeller Music Hall Company homepage
Available events at Rockefeller
Tilt Oslo
Torggata Bar Oslo
Oslo Bowling
Oslo Streetfood

1986 establishments in Norway
Music venues completed in 1986
Concert halls in Norway
Music venues in Oslo